Romulus is the outer and larger moon of the main-belt asteroid 87 Sylvia. It follows an almost-circular and close-to-equatorial orbit around the asteroid. In this respect it is similar to the other Sylvian moon Remus.

Romulus was discovered in February 2001 from the Keck II telescope by Michael E. Brown and Jean-Luc Margot. Its full designation is (87) Sylvia I Romulus; before receiving its name, it was known as S/2001 (87) 1.
The moon is named after Romulus, the mythological founder of Rome, one of the twins of Rhea Silvia raised by a wolf.

87 Sylvia has a low density, which indicates that it is probably a rubble pile formed when debris from a collision between its parent body and another asteroid re-accreted gravitationally. Therefore, it is likely that both Romulus and Remus, the second of Sylvia's moons, are smaller rubble piles which accreted in orbit around the main body from debris of the same collision. In this case their albedo and density are expected to be similar to Sylvia's.

Romulus's orbit is expected to be quite stable − it lies far inside Sylvia's Hill sphere (about 1/50 of Sylvia's Hill radius), but also far outside the synchronous orbit.

From Romulus's surface, Sylvia takes up an angular region 16°×10° across, while Remus's apparent size varies between 0.62° and 0.19° (for comparison, Earth's Moon has an apparent size of about 0.5°).

See also
 Remus (moon)

References

External links 
Data on (87) Sylvia from Johnston's archive (maintained by W. R. Johnston)
Rubble-Pile Minor Planet Sylvia and Her Twins (ESO news release, August 2005) Includes images and artists impressions
Adaptive Optics System Reveals New Asteroidal Satellite (SpaceDaily.com, March 2001) Includes a discovery image.
IAUC 7590, confirming the discovery of S/2001 (87) 1
IAUC 8582, reporting discovery of S/2004 (87) 1 and naming Romulus and Remus

Asteroid satellites
Discoveries by Michael E. Brown
87 Sylvia